Germania Sacra (Latin for "Sacred/Holy Germania/Germany") is a long-term research project into German church history from its beginnings through the Reformation in the 16th century to German mediatisation in the early 19th century.

History and Structure 
The first attempt to collect and publish the history of the German dioceses in reference books was made by Martin Gerbert, the prince-abbot of the monastery St. Blasien in the late 18th century, but his works were never completed.

Following into Gerberts footsteps, Paul Fridolin Kehr established a new Germania Sacra under the patronage of the Kaiser-Wilhelm-Society at the Kaiser-Wilhelm-Institute of German History in Berlin in 1917. He tried to connect the nationwide research projects and combine them under Germania Sacra to create an archival collection of monasteries, convents, cathedral chapters and religious dignitaries. After multiple financial problems, the first book was published on 11 June in 1929. It is part of the “Alte Folge”, which comprises seven volumes published between 1929 and 1972.

After the 2nd World War and the death of Kehr, the Kaiser-Wilhelm-Society wasn’t interested in supporting the institute any longer and the newly founded Max-Planck-Society took over the patronage of the institute and its project. Hermann Heimpel, the first head of the Max-Planck-Institute of History in Göttingen, continued work on the Germania Sacra in 1956, cooperating with an academic director, who coordinated the work of external researchers. While the last books of the Alte Folge were published between 1966 and 1972, the researchers under Heimpel began writing and publishing the Neue Folge, which were released between 1962 and 2007 in 50 volumes.
In 2007, the Max-Planck-Institute of History in Göttingen was rededicated and the work on the Germania Sacra was continued by theAcademy of Sciences and Humanities under the supervision of Prof. Dr. Hedwig Röckelein in Göttingen in 2008. The volumes of the Germania Sacra published after 2008 belong to the Dritte Folge and currently comprise 14 volumes (as of: June 2018).

In 2015 the first supplementary volume was published, which contains edited preparation work to the main works of Germania Sacra.

Objectives and methods 
The main objective of Germania Sacra is a statistical description of the ecclesiastical institutions which existed between the Holy Roman Empire and German mediatisation in the early 19th century. In achieving that objective, the entirety of sources and secondary literature concerning Medieval and Early Modern ecclesiastical institutions is to be portrayed. These institutions include the dioceses (with focus on the bishops), the cathedral chapters and the monasteries and convents up to and including their end during the reformation or the German mediatisation. At the beginning, the collection and the editing of the historical sources was mainly conducted by archivists at the request of Paul Kehr. In the present, the work on Germania Sacra is divided between historical research and the editorial department. The research is conducted by archivists, historians, members of ecclesiastical orders, theologians etc.

Germania Sacras publications are divided into the Alte Folge, the Neue Folge, the Dritte Folge, the Studien zur Germania Sacra and the Supplementbände zur Germania Sacra.

In addition to the volumes of Germania Sacra, the project provides two databases. A comprehensive inventory of medieval and early modern clerics and the "Database of monasteries, convents and collegiate churches of the Old Empire "

Publications and digital editions

Alte Folge

Neue Folge

Dritte Folge

Supplementbände

Literature
 Georg Pfeilschifter: Die St. Blasianische Germania Sacra. Ein Beitrag zur Historiographie des 18. Jahrhunderts. Kempten, 1921.
 Irene Crusius: Beiträge zu Geschichte und Struktur der mittelalterlichen Germania sacra. Göttingen, 1989.
 Irene Crusius: Die Germania Sacra. Stand und Perspektiven eines langfristigen Forschungsprojekts. In: Deutsches Archiv für Erforschung des Mittelalters. Vol. 52, 1996, pp. 629–642.
 Wolfgang Müller (Bearb.): Briefe und Akten des Fürstabtes Martin Gerbert. 2 volumes, 1962.
Sven Kriese: Die Germania Sacra in der Weimarer Republik und im Nationalsozialismus. In: Hedwig Röckelein (ed.), 100 Jahre Germania Sacra. Kirchengeschichte Schreiben vom 16. bis zum 21. Jahrhundert (Studien zur Germania Sacra. Neue Folge 8). Berlin/Boston 2018 (In Press), pp. 87–118.

References

External links 

Research projects
Research institutes in Germany
Historiography of Christianity
Encyclopedias of history
Christianity in the Holy Roman Empire
Education in Göttingen